Lai Kuan-lin, also romanized as Lai Guanlin and better known mononymously as Guanlin, (Hangul: 라이관린, born 23 September 2001) is a Taiwanese rapper, singer and actor based in South Korea and China. He is known for finishing seventh in Produce 101 Season 2 and was a member of the South Korean boy band Wanna One. He also formed a duo with Pentagon's Wooseok as Wooseok x Kuanlin in March 2019, under Cube Entertainment.

Early life
Lai was born in Taipei, Taiwan. Under his English name Edward Lai, he lived in Los Angeles, US for five years until he returned to Taiwan. He attended Lin-kou High School.

Career

2017–2018: Produce 101 and Wanna One

Lai was recruited by Cube Entertainment during the Cube Star World Audition in Taiwan in 2016. In 2017, Lai participated in the second season of Produce 101, representing Cube Entertainment. He ranked seventh during the final episode with 905,875 votes, securing him a place in the show's project boy group Wanna One under YMC Entertainment.

In November 2017, Lai appeared in labelmate Jeon So-yeon's music video for her single "Jelly".

As well as being active as a Wanna One member in South Korea, Lai is also active in China, receiving an offer from skincare brand Dr. Jart to be their brand ambassador, resulting in a great success for the company with over 900 million KRW (US$800,000) of the endorsed product being sold in 56 minutes.

2019–present: Disbandment of Wanna One, solo activities, and departure from Cube Entertainment
After Wanna One's disbandment on 31 December 2018, Cube Entertainment announced that Lai would focus on solo activities in China and that he would debut in a new boy group later in the year. He was confirmed to be the guest on variety show Happy Camp.

In January 2019, Lai was confirmed as male lead in Chinese drama A Little Thing Called First Love. Lai, alongside Yoo Seon-ho and Ha Neul were chosen as new models for TBJ clothing brand.

On 20 February 2019, Cube Entertainment announced that Lai would participate in a new group project alongside Pentagon's Wooseok titled Wooseok x Kuanlin. The unit released their debut extended play, 9801 on 11 March, with the title song "I'm A Star".

Lai held his first fanmeeting 'Good Feeling' on 6 April at Olympic Hall in Seoul. Followed by Bangkok (20 April), Singapore (30 April), Taipei (4 and 20 May) and Hong Kong (11 May).

In June 2020, Lai was cast in youth drama Don’t Think About Interrupting My Studies as the main lead, Lin Xiao Ran alongside Li Landi as Nan Xiangwan.

On 17 June 2021, the Seoul Central District Court ruled in Lai's favour and ended his contract with Cube Entertainment. This brought to a close a two-year dispute that started in July 2019, when Lai requested to terminate his contract. One of the claims Lai made was that Cube Entertainment had sold his artist management rights in China to a third party without notifying him. The judge agreed with Lai and deemed the contract invalid.

Endorsements
In 2018 and 2019, Lai Kuan-lin became an ambassador for Dr.Jart+, MGTV International APP, Chinese Social Assistance Foundation and Green Carpet Action (Marie Claire x China Green Foundation). He has endorsed Nongfu Spring (农夫山泉), TBJ, L'Oréal and Downy, KM Pharmaceutical (XYLIS), Perfect Diary, VIVLAS Lipstick, Wolong Nuts and elleair.

Personal life
In March 2021, Lai announced support for cotton from Xinjiang in mainland China, after some companies had expressed concerns about human rights abuses. The premier of Taiwan, Su Tseng-chang, later said that some of Taiwan's celebrities were selfish for expressing support for Xinjiang's cotton, and said that generations of people had worked hard in Taiwan to achieve democracy and its respect for human rights.

Discography

Filmography

Television series

Variety shows

Concert

Concert participation
 U & Cube Festival 2019 in Japan (23 March)

Awards and nominations

Notes

References

External links

 

2001 births
Living people
Produce 101 contestants
K-pop singers
Korean-language singers of Taiwan
English-language singers from Taiwan
Taiwanese dance musicians
Taiwanese idols
Taiwanese pop singers
Wanna One members
Swing Entertainment artists
Taiwanese expatriates in South Korea
Taiwanese male television actors
21st-century Taiwanese male actors
Cube Entertainment artists